Tongdewei is located in Tongde Subdistrict, Baiyun District, Guangzhou, Guangdong, China. It covers an area of 3.59 square kilometers. It is named Tongdewei because it is surrounded by tributaries of the Shijing River and the Pearl River.  Currently inhabited by 300,000 residents, only Xiwan Road and Xicha Road run through the north and south, which is regarded as a besieged city.

In history, Tongdewei included the five villages of Ezhang, Tianxin, Yuexi, Shangbu, and Hengjiao.  At the beginning of the 20th century, due to the developed waterway transportation, many merchants from cities and towns around Guangzhou lived here.  In 1990, the Guangzhou Municipal People's Government planned Tongdewei as a large-scale housing relief area. In 1996, tens of thousands of households from the old city were resettled here due to the construction of metro and the Inner Ring Road. In 1998, a new teacher village was built.  Public security, medical care, education and other aspects have failed to integrate with the urban area.  The dilemma was first reported on Guangzhou Television's main program News Day in 2005, and it entered the media coverage again at the end of 2007.

On January 19, 2010, Shangbu Bridge was the only bridge that crossed the Beihuan Expressway on Xicha Road. Since the bridge pier was crashed the day before, it was completely closed to traffic. 21 bus lines were cut off and motor vehicles could not pass. Tongde  The travel of 100,000 residents in the surrounding area was severely blocked, and the Shangbu Bridge resumed traffic after the interruption 26 days.

On January 21, 2012, Tongkang Road, connecting Xicha Road and Zengcha Road, was successfully opened to traffic before the Spring Festival. The traffic environment in Tongdewei, which has received much attention, could be greatly improved.  The north–south elevated highway was opened on December 28, 2014 to solve the traffic congestion problem caused by the only land access bottleneck in the Tongdewei section of Zengcha Road and Shangbuqiao Road.

Guangzhou Metro Line 8 has been extended on November 26, 2020 and will pass through the entire Tongdewei area from north to south with multiple stations. It is also expected to solve the traffic problem of local residents in and out.

References

Baiyun District, Guangzhou